"José Cuervo" is a song written and originally recorded by Cindy Jordan in 1982. It was released as a single by American country music artist  Shelly West in February 1983 to commercial success.

After a successful duet pairing with David Frizzell for three years, Shelly West went on her own to establish herself as a solo artist. Since her mother was country music singer, Dottie West, success came easily with the release of this song in 1983. The song hit No. 1 on the Country charts and was West's second (and last) No. 1 since 1981's duet with David Frizzell, "You're the Reason God Made Oklahoma". The song provided a sales boost for the Jose Cuervo tequila company and brought even more success to West. The song was released on her first solo album, West by West.

Content
The song is about a woman who drank too much Jose Cuervo tequila the night before.

The follow-up to her No. 1 hit was a Top 5 hit that same year titled, "Flight 309 to Tennessee".

Charts

Weekly charts

Year-end charts

References

1983 singles
1982 songs
Shelly West songs
Songs about alcohol
Billboard Hot Country Songs number-one singles of the year
Song recordings produced by Snuff Garrett